San Emigdio Creek, formerly Arroyo de San Emigdio (Spanish for Saint Emygdius Creek), is a  northward-flowing stream  in western Kern County, central California.

Geography

In years of heavy rainfall it would be a tributary to the Connecting Slough, the slough between Kern Lake and Buena Vista Lake which has been dry for decades due to agricultural diversion, pumping, and a lowering groundwater table.

History
Arroyo San Emigdio was a stream whose canyon provided the route followed by the 18th-19th century El Camino Viejo, through the San Emigdio Mountains between the Cuddy Valley and San Joaquin Valley. Its mouth provided a watering place between Cuddy Valley in the south and Arroyo de Amargosa (Bitterwater Creek) to the northwest near Buena Vista Lake.

The place where the creek emerged from the foothills of the San Emigdio Mountains was the location of Mexican land grant Rancho San Emidio of Alta California, granted in 1842 to José Antonio Dominguez. The location was a rancho and station of Mission Santa Barbara as early as 1824, and the 1842 land grant continued the rancho.

References

External links
 EL CAMINO VIEJO (The Old Highway)

Rivers of Kern County, California
San Emigdio Mountains
El Camino Viejo
Rivers of Southern California